The "National Anthem of the Republic of Colombia" is the official name of the national anthem of Colombia. It was originally written as a poem in 1850 by future President Rafael Núñez as an ode to celebrate the independence of Cartagena. The music was composed by Italian-born opera musician Oreste Síndici, at the request of Bogotan actor José Domingo Torres, during the presidency of Núñez, and with lyrics refined by Núñez himself, it was presented to the public for the first time on 11 November 1887. The song became very popular and was quickly adopted, albeit spontaneously, as the national anthem of Colombia.

It was made official through Law 33 of 18 October 1920. Colombian musician  reviewed the scores and prepared the transcriptions for symphonic band, which was adopted as an official version by decree 1963 of 4 July 1946. The anthem has been performed in various versions, been the subject of attempted reforms and been widely performed in the arts.

The lyrics of the anthem are composed of a chorus and eleven stanzas, though it is usually sung chorus–first verse–chorus.

History

Background 
In 1819, the contradanzas "" and "" were performed to celebrate the triumph of the patriots in the Battle of Boyacá. After the independence of Colombia in 1810 and the dissolution of Gran Colombia in 1831, numerous songs were written in honour of the liberator Simón Bolívar. One of the first antecedents of the national anthem was presented on 20 July 1836, when the Spanish Francisco Villalba, who had arrived in Colombia with a theatre company, composed a patriotic song for New Granada. The song became very popular and was considered the first patriotic anthem in the country. The verses of the chorus were as follows:

In 1847, English composer and painter Henry Price, founder of the Philharmonic Society, put music to some verses written by Santiago Pérez in an anthem called "" ("National Song"), which was not widely accepted, due to its simplicity. Henry Price was the father of Jorge Wilson Price, who, after living in New York City, returned to Bogotá in 1855 to dedicate himself to translating compositions and founding the National Academy of Music of Colombia in 1882, inviting the young Italian composer Oreste Síndici as an adviser and professor of the academy. In 1910, the National Academy of Music would become the National Conservatory of Colombia.

In 1849, José Caicedo Rojas wrote a poem, and José Joaquín Guarín composed the melody of an anthem called "" ("Ode to 20 July"), which was set to music in the key of E flat for four voices and orchestra.

Decree 256 of 12 April 1881 called for a competition to select the national anthem. The jurors for this contest were politician José María Quijano, poet Rafael Pombo and musician Carlos Schloss. In the reviews published in different newspapers, it was stated that none of the anthems performed aroused enthusiasm in the spirit of the jury and that for this reason the competition was declared void.

On 1 July 1883, the government of the Sovereign State of Cundinamarca organised a competition to select the anthem on the occasion of the centennial of the birth of the Liberator (Bolívar), on 24 July. The first prize was obtained by Daniel Figueroa, who composed an anthem with lyrics from various poems that premiered at the Plaza de Bolívar with a choir of 2,000 children. The second prize was obtained by Cayetano Fajardo. For its part, the jury noted that none of the awarded anthems were classified as national anthems but rather patriotic songs.

Composition 

In 1887, theatre director José Domingo Torres, who was used to enlivening the national holidays, sought out Síndici to ask him to write a song on the occasion of the celebration of the independence of Cartagena, which was the first Colombian city to declare independence from the Spanish, on 11 November 1811. For the song, Domingo Torres asked him to score a poem called  ("Patriotic Hymn"), written by President of the Republic Rafael Núñez, in honour of Cartagena, which was composed to be declared publicly during the celebration of 11 November 1850 and published in the newspaper La Democracia, when Núñez was still secretary of government of the Province of Cartagena. After this first publication, the poem was adapted, improved and published by Núñez himself in the magazine Hebdomadaria number 3 and 4, July 1883. A previous musicalisation of the same poem by Núñez, performed by maestros Delgado and Fortich, at the request of José Domingo Torres himself, which was performed at the Plaza de Bolívar on 20 July 1880, failed to gain acceptance among the audience present.

The following is the original poem by Rafael Núñez from 1850:

Initially, Síndici refused to compose the song, despite Torres's insistence. He finally managed to convince himself, through his wife Justina Jannaut. Prior to that, Síndici had demanded that José Domingo Torres look for the author of the poem so that he would adjust the verses according to the necessary arrangement for a melody and give them a national connotation.

For the composition of the anthem, Síndici retired to his Hacienda "" ("The Meadow") in Nilo, Cundinamarca, carrying a Dolt Graziano Tubi harmonium. The original score in the key of E-flat major and four-beat measure (tempo di marcia) currently rests in a room in the National Museum of Colombia. The pre-premiere of the melody would take place under a tamarind tree in the main park of the Cundinamarca municipality on 24 July 1887, after Sunday mass.

The national anthem was premiered on 11 November 1887 during the celebration of the independence of Cartagena with a choir of children from three primary schools, students of Síndici. Included within the programme of celebrations of that date was the laying of the first stone of the Municipal Theatre of Bogotá in this same place; the theatre was inaugurated in 1890 and operated there until its demolition and transfer to the Jorge Eliécer Gaitán Theater in 1952.

President Rafael Núñez learnt of the impact of the melody and invited Oreste Síndici to present it officially. The anthem was sung by a choir of 25 voices in the presence of the main civil, ecclesiastical and military authorities of the country. In the invitation to the event, the song was already announced as the "National Anthem".

Distribution 
The song quickly became well known, and several editions were published throughout the country in the following years. In 1890, the anthem was performed in Rome, Mexico, Lima, Caracas and Curaçao. The first phonographic recording was made at the Columbia Phonograph Company studios in New York City in July 1910, performed by the musical group  (The Antioquian Lyre) to celebrate the first centenary of the independence of Colombia. The national anthem appears referenced as such in various publications of the time, prior to its official adoption. Thus, an essay by Manuel María Fajardo from 1908, the patriotic primer by Camilo Villegas y González from 1910, a text of selected poems by Lisímaco Palau from 1912 and a hymn book by Ernesto Murillo from 1917 already cite the song composed by Oreste Síndici as the national anthem of Colombia.

For the adoption of the national anthem, the representative to the Chamber for the department of Nariño, Sergio Burbano, presented the bill on 9 August 1920. The plan was approved in the debate of the public instruction commission and later by the plenary session of the Congress of the Republic, making it official by Law 33 of 18 October 1920, which was sanctioned by President Marco Fidel Suárez. In this law, an expert opinion was also requested to recognise the artistic property rights of the heirs of Oreste Síndici.

During the border conflict with Peru (1932–1934), the soldiers who defended national sovereignty sang a refrain in the trumpet introduction when entering the battle front, in accordance with the warlike moment that the nation was experiencing. This transitory stanza stood as the following:

This introduction was taught to students in primary schools in the 1930s, according to historian José Antonio Amaya, and it was still being taught in the 1960s. The final line is very similar to a line in the national anthem of Cuba that goes, "¡Que morir por la patria es vivir!"

As time went by, different versions of the anthem appeared. In 1946, the Ministry of National Education, with the aim of unifying the criteria, appointed a commission made up of experts. As a result of this investigation, the government issued executive decree number 1963 of 4 July 1946, stating that the official scores and the transcriptions for symphony orchestra of the anthem made by Norte de Santander musician  in 1933 are the most faithful to the originals written by Oreste Síndici. Since then, this version has been officially adopted. During the government of Belisario Betancur, San Andrés residents were authorised to sing a version of the anthem in English and indigenous peoples to sing the version in their own languages.

Decree 3558 of 9 November 1949, which  approves the "Garrison Service Regulations", is the first protocol norm that establishes the occasions on which the anthem must be sung. Law 12 of 29 February 1984 ratified in its article 4 the validity of the national anthem of Colombia.

Law 198 of 17 July 1995, which legislates national symbols, made it mandatory to broadcast them on all radio and television stations in the country at both 6:00 a.m. and 6:00 p.m. (with the latter medium, on a varied schedule for those deprived of clear signal and not applicable to national cable TV channels), as well as during public addresses by the President of the Republic and other official events.

Lyrics
The stanzas are a recount of historical events and philosophical reflections on the independence of Colombia and other Latin American countries. Stanzas I and III can be described as evocative, stanzas II, V, and XI heroic, stanzas VI and VII epic, stanzas IV and VIII elegiac, and stanzas IX and X synthetic. The music has a tonality of E flat major and 4/4 time (tempo di marcia).

Protocol 

The rules of protocol for singing and listening to the national anthem of Colombia are regulated in articles 10 and 11 of decree 1967 of 15 August 1991. The national anthem is authorised to be played at official functions that have a patriotic character, when raising and lowering the flag of Colombia, when honouring the Blessed Sacrament and at educational events and sports competitions. It is also authorised to sing it with or without musical accompaniment by the general public.

When listening to the national anthem, those present must stop their activities and stand up, and the men must uncover their heads. All people should release their arms and adopt a posture of respect and veneration. Riders, drivers and passengers of the vehicles must alight and proceed accordingly. The national anthem is never applauded.

By decree 91 of 21 January 1942, only Colombian patriotic anthems are allowed to be sung in the country's educational institutions, with the exception of special ceremonies in honour of friendly countries that are held on campus. In accordance with decree 1722 of 16 July 1942, all schools must begin their tasks on the first Monday of each month with a brief but solemn act during which the flag is raised to the chords of the national anthem, sung by the whole community. According to the Protocol Manual of the Ministry of Foreign Affairs, for the presentation of the credentials of a new ambassador, the performance of the national anthem is assigned to the Band of Musicians of the Presidential Guard Battalion.

Verses 
The anthem should be played chorus-verse-chorus. Although the first verse is usually sung between choruses, any of the eleven verses may be used. The anthem should be played chorus-verse-chorus regardless of which verse is selected. This is how it is customarily performed in all public, political, and other important events both public and private.

However, it is not uncommon for only the chorus and verse to be played without repeating the chorus. This is usually the case when brevity is sought. Official 6:00 am and 6:00 pm radio broadcasts of the national anthem invariably use the shorter format. The shorter anthem is also used at international events such as the Olympic Games or World Cup.

In ceremonies of the Colombian Artillery, the last verse is used instead of the first verse. The Colombian Cavalry traditionally uses the sixth verse, while the fourth verse is used by the Colombian Navy.

Attempted reforms 

On 25 September 1997, a citizen filed a lawsuit of unconstitutionality against ten of the eleven stanzas of the national anthem and inexorability of the regulations that officially adopted it because, according to the plaintiff, the lyrics constitute an apology for violence and religious discrimination and encourage class struggle. The constitutional court, through ruling C-469, declared Law 33 of 1920, which adopted the national anthem, enforceable. Responding to the aforementioned demand, the Constitutional Court indicated in the judgment:

A 2008 bill proposed that citizens be ordered to take a firm stance with their heads held high and their right hands over their hearts when listening to the national anthem. The plan was inspired by the gesture that former president Álvaro Uribe usually adopts when singing the national anthem.

Another bill that was processed in the Colombian Congress was that presented by Senator  of the Second Commission of the Senate of the Republic on 30 April 2009, in which he proposed a change to the last lines of the sixth stanza as follows:

In 2016, it was proposed to add a new stanza in commemoration of the Peace Dialogues that had taken place that year.

Versions 

The first edition of the national anthem published by Oreste Síndici included the scores for singing and piano performances. From then on, different transcriptions and versions appeared, until the officialisation in 1946 of the scores for symphonic band and military band published by José Rozo Contreras. In addition to these scores, Rozo himself published a version for a cappella mixed choir for soprano, alto, tenor and bass voices.

The national anthem has been performed with an accordion and a vallenato rhythm on several occasions, notably within the framework of the Festival de la Leyenda Vallenata. Some of these performances have been made by Jorge Celedón, Rafael Orozco and Silvestre Dangond. A version of the anthem in rock rhythm by the group Ekhymosis, of which Juanes was a member, made in 1995 for the radio station Radioacktiva generated controversy in various media.

The animated series  ("The Following Programme"), in episode 4 of the second season, created the parody the "Chibchombia National Anthem", known as the "Anthem of Corruption".

The version of the national anthem on marimba was presented in June 2009 by the secretariat of culture of Valle del Cauca with indigenous rhythms of the Colombian Pacific under the musical direction of Raúl Rosero, in the celebration of the centenary of the creation of the department of Valle del Cauca.

In the National Concert of the Bicentennial of Colombia in July 2010, different versions of the anthem were heard in various cities of the country, in various languages ​​and in various styles of interpretation. Shakira performed the anthem again a cappella during the inauguration of the 6th Summit of the Americas at the Cartagena de Indias Convention Center on 14 April 2012.

Representations

Art 
The national anthem has been referenced through different artistic manifestations. In poetry, two compositions can be mentioned in honour of the national anthem that were published in the newspaper La Pluma de Cali in June 1944, which were included by educator Evangelista Quintana in his article titled  ("The Public School Gives Colombia Its National Anthem").

The triumphal arch erected on the Boyacá Bridge is the only monument that contains the lyrics of the national anthem. The arch was built in 1954 by teacher Luis Alberto Acuña and contains the complete notes of the anthem in the lower part, which is in the same place the Battle of Boyacá took place.

The façade of the Alberto Castilla Music Hall of the Tolima Conservatory, located in the historic centre of Ibagué, is decorated with a stave that contains the musical notes of the national anthem.

An artistic composition was the reason for a stamp in honour of the national anthem issued by the National Postal Administration in 1988 to mark the centenary of the melody.

Film 
One of the first references to the national anthem in film appeared on 1 April 1937 in the film  ("The First Rehearsals of the National Talking Cinema") produced by the Acevedo brothers, where the National Band, directed by José Rozo Contreras, performs an instrumental interpretation with the symphonic arrangements that were made official in 1946. The premiere of some first films such as Antonia Santos (1944) was accompanied by a live performance of the national anthem.

In 2006, a controversy arose due to the song "" ("Here the Boss Commands") that is used in the film El colombian dream, which is based on the music of the national anthem.

A short film produced by Rafael Enrique Galán, which was selected by the Ministry of Culture in a competition by the Cinematographic Development Fund in October 2009, was titled ¡Oh gloria inmarcesible!, alluding to the first verse of the national anthem. The production participated in the competition within the category of making short films.

Notes

References

External links
 Colombia: Himno Nacional de la República de Colombia (¡Oh gloria inmarcesible!) - Audio of the national anthem of Colombia, with information and lyrics (archive link)
 "Letra official del Himno de la República de Colombia"

Colombian songs
National symbols of Colombia
Colombia
Spanish-language songs
1887 songs
National anthems
National anthem compositions in A-flat major
National anthem compositions in E-flat major